The District of Columbia (a political division coterminous with Washington, D.C.) holds general elections every two years to fill various D.C. government offices, including mayor, attorney general, members of the D.C. Council, members of the D.C. State Board of Education, and members of its Advisory Neighborhood Commissions. Special elections may be held to fill vacancies at other points in time. Additionally, citywide ballot measures may be proposed and voted on.

Procedure
Elections in the District of Columbia are administered by the D.C. Board of Elections.

Elected offices

Federal

President

Congress

According to the Article One of the Constitution, only states may be represented in the United States Congress. The District of Columbia is not a U.S. state and therefore has no voting representation.

In 1970, Congress enacted the District of Columbia Delegate Act, which established the District of Columbia's at-large congressional district and permitted residents to elect a non-voting delegate to the House of Representatives. Nearly 100 years prior in the 1870s, the congressional district briefly existed before Congress abolished it in favor of direct rule.

The majority of residents want the district to become a state and gain full voting representation in Congress. To prepare for this goal, the district has elected shadow representatives and shadow senators since 1990. The shadow congresspeople emulate the role of representing the district in the House and Senate and push for statehood alongside the House delegate.

Local

Mayor

Attorney General
The Attorney General for the District of Columbia is an elected office.

D.C. Council
The Council of the District of Columbia is the elected legislative body of the city. Members serve two-year terms.

D.C. Board of Education
The D.C. State Board of Education is an elected executive agency of the D.C. government that is responsible for managing the district's public education. Members serve four-year terms.

Advisory Neighborhood Commissions

Voting rights and voter powers

Ballot measures

Political parties
The District of Columbia recognizes four major political parties:
 District of Columbia Democratic State Committee, an affiliate of the U.S. Democratic Party
 District of Columbia Republican Party, an affiliate of U.S. Republican Party
 D.C. Statehood Green Party, an affiliate of the U.S. Green Party
 Libertarian Party of the District of Columbia, an affiliate of U.S. Libertarian Party

To be a major party, it must be eligible to conduct a primary election, and to be eligible, a political party must have received 7,500 cumulative votes for mayor, for councillor, for attorney general, or for U.S. presidential electors in the most recent general election. The district has a closed primary system, meaning that a voter may only participate in a political party's primary if they are a registered member of that party (typically the 21st day) before the primary.

Minor political parties do not meet those qualifications or are established for the first time, and they may only participate in general elections. They include the Socialist Workers Party of the District of Columbia, an affiliate of the U.S. Socialist Workers Party which last participated in the 2020 general election, and the Umoja Party, which last participated in the 2000 general election.

Party strength

The Democratic State Committee dominates district politics. The city only ever elected a Democratic mayor and attorney general, only ever voted for the Democratic candidate for all of its federal offices, and elects the maximum number of Democratic candidates to its city council.

See also
 Electoral history of Marion Barry

References

 
Government of the District of Columbia
Political events in Washington, D.C.